Yuliana Marinova (born 24 July 1967) is a retired Bulgarian sprinter who specialized in the 400 metres.

She finished eighth in the 4 x 400 metres relay at the 1987 World Championships, with teammates Tsvetanka Ilieva, Rositsa Stamenova and Pepa Pavlova.

Her personal best time was 50.82 seconds, achieved in August 1987 in Sofia.

References

1967 births
Living people
Bulgarian female sprinters
21st-century Bulgarian women
20th-century Bulgarian women